Public standards in the United Kingdom may refer to:

Committee on Standards in Public Life
Parliamentary Standards Authority 
Standards Board for England 
Standards Commission for Scotland
Ethical Standards in Public Life etc. (Scotland) Act 2000

See also
International Public Sector Accounting Standards#United_Kingdom